Isabel Charisius is a classical violist and an academic teacher. She was a member of the Alban Berg Quartett and a teacher at the universities of music of Cologne and Berlin.

Career 

Charisius is focused on chamber music. She was the viola player of the Alban Berg Quartett from 2005, after the death of Thomas Kakuska and upon his wish, until its dissolution. A concert in London's Queen Elizabeth Hall in 2008 with quartets by Haydn, Berg and Beethoven received a review mentioning: "When Charisius was allowed the bass-line, as in some moments in the slow movement of the Haydn, she produced a magical, burnished sound like liquid gold".

Charisius was a lecturer at the Musikhochschule Köln from 2005 to 2013. She has been a teacher of viola and chamber music at the Hochschule Luzern. She has conducted master classes, for example at the  Guildhall School of Music in London, the Britten-Pears School in Aldeburgh and the Universität der Künste in Berlin.

References

External links 

 

Classical violists
Living people
Year of birth missing (living people)
Place of birth missing (living people)
20th-century classical musicians
21st-century classical musicians
20th-century violists
21st-century violists